Sir Charles Ernest Hercus  (13 June 1888 – 26 March 1971) was a New Zealand doctor and professor of public health. He was born in Dunedin, New Zealand, on 13 June 1888. He was for many years dean of the University of Otago Dunedin School of Medicine. The Hercus Building of the Dunedin campus, on the corner of Great King and Hanover Streets, is named for him.

Hercus was appointed a Knight Bachelor in the 1947 New Year Honours.
The Health Research Council of New Zealand offers an annual Sir Charles Hercus Health Research Fellowship, worth up to NZD600,000 "for emerging scientists who have demonstrated outstanding potential to develop into highly skilled researchers able to initiate new avenues of investigation", in his honour.

References

1888 births
1971 deaths
New Zealand public health doctors
People from Dunedin in health professions
Academic staff of the University of Otago
New Zealand Knights Bachelor
New Zealand Companions of the Distinguished Service Order
New Zealand Officers of the Order of the British Empire